Stigmella oligosperma is a moth of the family Nepticulidae.

External links
Nepticulidae and Opostegidae of the world

Nepticulidae
Moths of Asia
Moths described in 1934